The Mixed team competition at the 2017 World Judo Championships was held on 3 September 2017.

Results

Finals

Repechage

Pool A

Pool B

Pool C

Pool D

Prize money
The sums listed bring the total prizes awarded to 57,000$ for the individual event.

References

External links
 

team
World Mixed Team Judo Championships
World 2017